In Hinduism, Chandraghanta is the third navadurga aspect of goddess Mahadevi, worshipped on the third day of Navaratri (the nine divine nights of Navadurga). Her name Chandra-Ghanta, means "one who has a half-moon shaped like a bell". Her third eye is always open, signifying her perpetual readiness for battle against evil. She is also known as Chandrakhanda, Chandika or Rannchandi. She is believed to reward people with her grace, bravery and courage. By her grace,  all the sins, distresses, physical sufferings, mental tribulations and ghostly hurdles of the devotees are eradicated.

Legend 

According to Shiva Purana, Chandraghanta is the “Shakti” of Lord Shiva in the form of Chandrashekhara. Each aspect of Shiva is accompanied by Shakti, therefore are Ardhanarishvara.

Form

Chandraghanta has ten hands where two hands hold a Trishula(trident), Gada(mace), bow-arrow, khadak(sword), Kamala(lotus flower), Ghanta(bell) and kamandalu (waterpot), while one of her hands remains in blessing posture or abhayamudra(Fear dispelling). She rides on a tiger or lion as her vehicle, which represents bravery and courage, she wears a half moon depicting a Bell on her forehead and has a third eye in the middle of her forehead. Her complexion is golden. Shiva sees Chandraghanta's form as a great example of beauty, charm and grace.

Chandraghanta rides a tiger or lion as her vehicle, however in accordance with many of the scriptures there is the mention of "Simhaasana", "Simharudha" which refer to the lion (Simha) as being ridden (Rudha) or them being seated on as (Asana) by the goddesses. This form of Devi Chandraghanta is a more warrior ready and apparently aggressive form that goddess Durga takes, however despite being adorned with the various weapons, she is also equally caring, benevolent and representes motherly qualities to her devotees. While the primary cause of this form was the destruction demons, her rather fierce depiction brings with it the encouragement that praying to her can grant one fearlessness. She is otherwise the very embodiment of serenity.

The devotees who adore and worship Chandraghanta develop an aura of divine splendor. Chandraghanta is ready to destroy the wicked, but to her devotees she is a kind and compassionate mother showering peace and prosperity. During the battle between her and the demons, the thunderous sound produced by her bell is known to have paralyzed and stunned the demons. She is ever ready to fight which shows her eagerness to destroy the foes of her devotees so that they may live in peace and prosperity. Her abode is in Manipura chakra.

Prayers

Mantra 
ॐ देवी चन्द्रघण्टायै नम: ॥

om̐ devī candra-ghaṇṭāyai namaḥ ॥

Dhyāna-Mantra 

पिण्डजप्रवरारूढ़ा चण्डकोपास्त्रकैर्युता ।

प्रसीदं तनुते महयं चन्द्रघण्टेति विश्रुता ॥

piṇḍaja-pravarārūḍhā chanda-kopā-astrakair-yutā ।

prasidaṃ tanute mahyaṃ candra-ghaṇṭeti viśhrutā ॥

References 

Destroyer goddesses
Hindu goddesses
 
War goddesses
Shaktism
Consorts of Shiva
Forms of Parvati